Salamat is one of the 23 regions of Chad, located in the south-east of the country. The region's capital is Am Timan. It corresponds to the former prefecture of the same name.

Geography 
Salamat borders Sila Region to the north, the Central African Republic to the south-east, and Moyen-Chari Region and Guéra Region to the west and north-west. The terrain is generally flat savannah. Half of the Zakouma National Park lies in the region.

Settlements 
Am Timan is the region's capital; other major settlements include Abgué, Abou-Deïa, Am Habilé, Djouna, Haraze, Mangueigne and Mouraye.

Demographics 
As per the 2009 Chadian census, the population of Salamat is 302,301. The main ethnolinguistic groups are Arab groups such as the Baggara (generally speakers of Chadian Arabic), Birgit, Gula groups such as the Gula Iro and Bon Gula, Jonkor Bourmataguil, Kibet, Runga and Toram.

Economy 
Salamat's economy is based on subsistence agriculture, fishery and cotton. Salamat has been described as the "poorest  region in the world" by the World Bank, International Monetary Fund, and other sources. There is a limited amount of tourism activity related to Zakouma National Park.

Subdivisions 
The region of Salamat is divided into three departments:

References

 
Regions of Chad